Sweet Disarray is the debut studio album by British recording artist Dan Croll. It was released on 10 March 2014 by Deram Records in the United Kingdom.

Composition
The closing track, "Home", is a sweet, jangly folk-pop tune that was inspired by Croll's days as a broke student, coming home after an ill-advised and ill-prepared-for winter weekend getaway to Berlin.

Critical reception

At Metacritic, which assigns a rated mean out of 100 from mainstream critics, the album received a score of 59, which indicates "mixed or average reviews". Writing for AllMusic, Timothy Monger gave the album four out of five stars, calling Sweet Disarray a "colorful and immaculately produced debut album" which "proves [that] Croll has both a forward-looking experimentalism and pretty solid songwriting chops to boot. In spite of the extremely high expectations, he has managed a pretty neat debut that will please fans who have been waiting since his early singles". In her review for The Guardian, Caroline Sullivan compared Croll to  American singer-songwriter Jack Johnson and declared Sweet Disarray "a pretty good album" that "conflates lilting Scousepop and electronica into a warm nether-genre, with added sleek choruses that sound equally right on 6Music and Radio 1. Filter magazine journalist Laura Studarus called Sweet Disarray "a rare debut, as well crafted as it is likeable". She praised its "sound that suggests Paul McCartney with a taste for Afro-pop, rock, electronics and the occasional grand-sweeping, Paul Simon–style folk gesture."

DIY author Emma Swann felt that "despite [its] variety, not once does the record feel disjointed, or out of place. It’s a skill, but Croll’s soothing vocals, as well as he and his team’s spot-on engineering of the whole lot means it can slide from that soaring single to Croll’s inner Justin Timberlake via steel guitars and ukulele without missing a beat. It’s pleasantly pristine stuff from the still relative newcomer". Joe Rivers, writing for Clash magazine, found that Sweet Disarray was "patchy" and that it "would be an unremarkable singer-songwriter album were it not for Croll's welcome smatterings of electronica, soul and, most intriguingly, Afrobeat throughout. In his The Independent review, Andy Gill wrote that Croll's "ambitious arrangements need more disarray, and less sweetness". Similarly, Kate Wills from sister newspaper The Independent on Sunday concluded that Sweet Disarray "won’t frighten the horses, but it might encourage you to buy an overpriced T-shirt. Job’s a good ’un." Less impressed, Randall Colburn from Consequence of Sound felt that the album "reads more like a college thesis designed to satiate a panel of professors than it does an original document". He added that it "sounds like a who’s who of Spotify buzz bands, a time-stamped memo alerting music executives to the mainstream’s idea of indie rock [...] Croll remains a mystery, a patchwork of influences content to blend in, not to stand out."

Track listing
Credits adapted from the liner notes of Sweet Disarray.

Charts

References

External links
 DanCroll.com — official site

2014 debut albums
Dan Croll albums